David McMath (born 31 August 1996) is a Scottish sport shooter. He competed in the men's double trap event at the 2018 Commonwealth Games, winning the gold medal. McMath was born in Dumfries but brought up in Castle Douglas attending the high school there.

References

1996 births
Living people
Scottish male sport shooters
Place of birth missing (living people)
Shooters at the 2018 Commonwealth Games
Commonwealth Games gold medallists for Scotland
Commonwealth Games medallists in shooting
British male sport shooters
Medallists at the 2018 Commonwealth Games